Himno Nacional means National Anthem in Spanish.  It may refer to:

Himno Nacional Argentino
Himno Nacional de Bolivia
Himno Nacional de Chile
Himno Nacional de Costa Rica
Himno Nacional de El Salvador
Himno Nacional de Guatemala
Himno Nacional de Honduras
Himno Nacional de la República de Colombia
Himno nacional de Panamá (National anthem of Panama)
Himno Nacional del Perú
Himno Nacional de Uruguay
Himno Nacional Dominicano
Himno Nacional Mexicano
Himno Nacional de Venezuela

See also 
 National anthem